Héctor Luis Freschi (born in Resistencia, Chaco May 22, 1911, death on July 18, 1993) was an Argentinian football goalkeeper who played for Argentina in the 1934 FIFA World Cup. He also played for Sarmiento de Resistencia.

Fifa World Cup Career

References

External links
FIFA profile

Argentine footballers
Argentine people of Italian descent
Argentina international footballers
Association football goalkeepers
1934 FIFA World Cup players
1911 births
Year of death missing
People from Resistencia, Chaco
Sportspeople from Chaco Province